Hamid Idris Awate (10 April 1910 – 28 May 1962) was the founder of the Eritrean Army (the armed wing of the Eritrean Liberation Front), and a symbol of the Eritrean struggle for independence.

Early life in Italian Eritrea
Awate was born in 1910 in Gerset, located between Tessenei and Golluj in southwestern Italian Eritrea. His father, a peasant, trained him as early as childhood in the use of guns. Hamid was of Tigre and Nara descent.

In 1935, Hamid was conscripted by the Italians to serve in the colonial army of the Eritrean Ascari. Beside his fluency in Arabic, Tigre, Tigrinya, Nara, Hedareb, and Kunama, Hamid learned the Italian language very well within a short period of time and was sent to Rome for a course in military intelligence.
    
After returning from Italy, he was appointed as a security officer in western Eritrea. Shortly after, he served as deputy chief (Mayor) of the city of Kassala (Sudan) and its surroundings during the brief Italian occupation of that city in 1940/1941 at the beginning of World War II. As Mayor of Kassala he promoted the political union of that city to his country, Eritrea, but Allied offensives at the end of January 1941 forced him to renounce to it.

He fought as an Eritrean ascari in the Battle of Keren during World War II and participated in the Italian guerrilla campaign in Eritrea against Allied forces with the cavalrymen of Ali Gabre.

After the Italians were completely pushed out of Eritrea, Hamid settled in western Eritrea but eventually went into a dispute against the British authorities and began an armed campaign against Britain's control over Eritrea from 1942 to 1948. Afterwards, Hamid and his armed faction came to a truce agreement with the British authorities.

In the meantime, the Eritrean independence movement was taking shape and working towards making Eritrea an independent country by peaceful means rather than joining landlocked Ethiopia.

Resistance against Ethiopia
In 1958 a group of Eritrean exiles in Cairo founded the Eritrean Liberation Movement under Hamid's leadership.

In July 1960, in the city of Cairo, a group of young Eritrean students and intellectuals held a meeting and formed the Eritrean Liberation Front (ELF).

Back home, the Eritrean  authorities were suspicious of Hamid's movements and activities and were watching him closely. Eritrean police forces planned to arrest Hamid in his village in August 1961. Turkey explains that the Ethiopians deployed a large amount of police forces but their plans were foiled by an Eritrean Muslim within the Eritrean police who informed Hamid earlier of that plan. Hamid then fled to Mount Adal located to the west of Agordat.

Hamid's decision to begin armed resistance was reached after a period of long deliberations with other Muslims. In an interview with Eritrea Al-haditha, issue #75, second year, pioneer Mohammed Al-Hassan Dohen, a long time friend of Hamid and Hamid's assistant when he was district chief, says: "In the year 1960, Idris Mohammed Adem sent a message to Hamid. Hamid Awate told me that Idris Mohammed Adem was asking him to declare the armed struggle; but he was not ready for it at that time.  After four months, Mohammed Al-Shiekh Daood came and asked Hamid to declare the revolution. Hamid agreed to lead the armed struggle and declare the revolution but asked for money and weapons as long as he was notorious Outlaw. Mohammed Al-Shiekh Daood braved Hamid with old arms, three five bullet rifles "abu khamsa" and gave him 3 Birr with sugar and tea all was provided throw Egyptian Muslims. In addition, Ibrahim Mohammed Ali brought two rifles.

On 1 September 1961, eleven rebels led by Hamid attacked police posts in the west of Eritrea include one on Mount Adal.  A fierce battle ensued between Hamid's and Eritrean police forces, lasting 30 minutes ending in a stalemate.

Death

On May 27 1962, Awate told his unit that he was not feeling well. His condition began to deteriorate quickly. It is said that Awate called pioneer Kiboob Hajaj and gave him his beloved gun emphasizing on the continuation of the revolution. On the morning of next day, Awate died; his companions buried him secretly and did not reveal his death until four years later.

A statue was erected by the Government of Eritrea on 1 September 1994 at his grave site.

Even in Italy Hamid is celebrated by the Italo-Eritrean associations.

References

External links
 From the Experiences of the ELA
 "Sept.1: Day Of 1st Shot That Led to Eritrea's Independence" 
 Ascari: I Leoni di Eritrea/Ascari: The Lions of Eritrea, a website in honor of the Eritrean Ascari
 "In Memory of Awate the History Maker" by Taher Indoul
 "Seeing the image of an Eritrean Hero"

1910 births
1962 deaths
Eritrean People's Liberation Front members
People of former Italian colonies
Eritrean soldiers
Italian military personnel of World War II
People from Gash-Barka Region